Henri 4 is a 2010 drama film directed by Jo Baier. It is a German-French-Austrian-Spanish co-production.

Plot
France in 1563. Calvinist Protestantism has arrived in France. But the Catholic reaction is not long in coming and the small but steadily growing Protestant population is suppressed in French society. However, the Huguenots, particularly in the south of France and in the small kingdom of Navarre near Spain, resisted. Katharina de Medici, the actual ruler of France, wants to counter this. Her two sons, Charles IX. and D’Anjou show weakness in this fight and Henri, the young Prince of Navarre, vital strength. Katharina de Medici has to give in and makes Henri an offer of peace, which he, tired of fighting, accepts. This peace also means that Henri Margot, the daughter of the Medicis, married in Paris. But even during the wedding celebrations, the Catholics strike: They cause a bloodbath among the Protestant wedding guests who have traveled. About 20,000 Huguenots die on this Bartholomew Night.

Cast
 Julien Boisselier – Henri IV
 Joachim Król – Agrippa
 Andreas Schmidt – Guillaume du Bartas
 Roger Casamajor – Maximilien de Béthune 'Rosny'
 Armelle Deutsch – Margot
 Chloé Stefani – Gabrielle d'Estrées
 Sven Pippig – Beauvoise
 Sandra Hüller – Catherine
 Hannelore Hoger – Catherine de' Medici
 Ulrich Noethen – Charles IX
 Devid Striesow – Henry III
 Matt Zemlin
 Jakub Fischer - Soldier

References

External links 

2010 films
2010 drama films
Films scored by Henry Jackman
Films scored by Hans Zimmer
Films about royalty
Films about nobility
Films set in the 16th century
Films set in the 17th century
Films set in the 1600s
Films set in the 1610s
Austrian drama films
French drama films
German drama films
2010s German-language films
Historical epic films
2010s Italian-language films
Latin-language films
Spanish drama films
Films based on German novels
Cultural depictions of Catherine de' Medici
Henry IV of France
Films directed by Jo Baier
2010s French films
2010s German films